SMS Friedrich der Grosse may refer to:

 , an armored frigate
 , a battleship

See also
  or USS Huron (ID-1408), a passenger ship turned transport ship

German Navy ship names